Robert "Bob" Fisher (September 21, 1922 – September 19, 2008) was an American playwright, and television and film screenwriter mostly of situational comedy.

Biography
One of the most prolific of sitcom writers, Fisher began in television the 1950s by pairing up with a veteran radio writer twenty-five years his senior named Alan Lipscott. Lipscott and Fisher wrote the first episode of the CBS-TV sitcom series Make Room For Daddy (starring Danny Thomas) in 1953, and went on to craft teleplays for The Donna Reed Show, Bachelor Father (which starred John Forsythe), Bronco, How to Marry a Millionaire, and others.  Following Lipscott's death in 1961, Fisher then began writing with Arthur Marx, and that partnership (which lasted for over twenty-five years) produced episodes of McHale's Navy, My Three Sons, The Mothers-in-Law, the short lived ABC-TV series The Paul Lynde Show, and NBC-TV's Life With Lucy in 1986. He and Marx were also story editors and frequent writers on CBS-TV's Alice from 1977–1981.

Fisher also wrote occasionally with Arthur Alsberg (on I Dream of Jeannie and Mona McCluskey) and had three plays produced on Broadway: the hit The Impossible Years (with Marx), Minnie's Boys (with Marx), and Happiness Is Just a Little Thing Called a Rolls Royce (with Alsberg), which closed after one performance.

Fisher is also the author of the book "The Knight in Rusty Armor".  A beautiful tale of man's journey to discover himself through a series of comic and tragic transformations.

Death
Fisher died in 2008 in Topanga, California, just two days before his 86th birthday, although other sources given the date of death as 26 September.

Works as screenwriter
His many works as a television writer included:

Partial filmography

 
Fisher also produced television episodes for:
McHale’s Navy
My Three Sons
The Mothers-in-Law
The Paul Lynde Show
Life With Lucy 
Cheyenne 

His plays included:

Happiness Is Just a Little Thing Called a Rolls Royce (1968)
The Impossible Years (1968)
Minnie's Boys (1970)
Groucho: A Life in Revue (1987)

In his last few years he was said to lead a "a peripatetic lifestyle".

References

External links

20th-century American dramatists and playwrights
1922 births
2008 deaths
Writers from California